William Edwin Ryerson (born December 10, 1936) is an American former diplomat who was a career Foreign Service Officer. He served as the U.S. Ambassador Extraordinary and Plenipotentiary to Albania from 1991 until 1994.

Ryerson was born in Pompton Lakes, New Jersey on December 10, 1936. After a 52-year break, diplomatic relations between the United States and Albania were re-established on March 15, 1991.  The U.S. Embassy in Tirana opened October 1, 1991.  Christopher Hill as Chargé d'Affaires ad interim until Ryerson presented his credentials on December 21, 1991.

The Cornell University graduate (he began as an engineering major before switching to history) was consul general in Yugoslavia in the late 1980s.

References

External links
Library of Congress Oral History Project

1936 births
Living people
United States Foreign Service personnel
Ambassadors of the United States to Albania
Cornell University alumni
20th-century American diplomats